Susan Elaine Hartley  is a British ecologist and is Vice-President for Research at the University of Sheffield.  Previously she was director of the York Environmental Sustainability Institute (YESI) at the University of York  and Professor of Ecology at the University of Sussex, specialising in interactions between plants and animals. In December 2009 she delivered the Royal Institution Christmas Lectures on The 300 Million Years War, broadcast on More4.

Education 
Sue Hartley attended St Hugh's College,  University of Oxford, England, where she undertook an undergraduate BA degree in biochemistry. She then studied for DPhil postgraduate degree at the University of York in field of ecology. Her research considered the defences used by plants against being eaten by insects.

Career 
Hartley worked at the Centre for Ecology and Hydrology, located close to Aberdeen in Scotland. Here she researched herbivorous foraging by animals such as red deer and sheep, considering the effect on the moorlands.
She moved to the University of Sussex in 2001, where she was a Reader and then Professor in the School of Biological Sciences. At Sussex, Hartley's research group studies how plants defend themselves from being eaten and also how plant responses to herbivores affect other organisms that attack plants. In addition, she researches into interactions between plants and herbivores, including projects on camels and goats overgrazing in the Sinai desert and on the impact of insects consuming tropical tree seedlings in Borneo and Uganda.
Hartley was Director of Research and Knowledge Exchange at the University of Sussex.
For the European Food Safety Authority and the European Commission, Prof. Hartley has advised on the ecological effect of organisms that have been genetically modified. She has also been President of the British Ecological Society (2016-2017). She is a Trustee of the Royal Botanic Gardens, Kew (2016–present) and is a non-executive board member for Natural England (2018-2021).
She was appointed an Officer of the Order of the British Empire in the Queen's Birthday Honours for 2019 for 'services to Ecological Research
and Public Engagement'

References

External links 
 Sue Hartley, Another view: Ecologist Sue Hartley on The Happening, The Guardian, 24 June 2008.
 Video of a public lecture given by Sue Hartley, University of Sussex March 2010.
 Is Chris Grayling being realistic about growing more food after Brexit? C4 FactCheck October 2017.

Year of birth missing (living people)
Living people
British ecologists
Women ecologists
British women scientists
Alumni of the University of Oxford
Alumni of the University of York
Academics of the University of Sussex
British women biologists
Academics of the University of York